Rarden Township is one of the sixteen townships of Scioto County, Ohio, United States.  The 2010 census counted 1,249 people in the township, 1,090 of whom lived in the unincorporated parts of the township.

Geography
Located in the northwestern corner of the county, it borders the following townships:
Sunfish Township, Pike County - north
Camp Creek Township, Pike County - northeast
Morgan Township - east
Brush Creek Township - south
Meigs Township, Adams County - southwest
Franklin Township, Adams County - west

The village of Rarden lies in the center of the township.

Name and history
Rarden Township was organized January 10, 1891. The township was named after Thomas Rarden, pioneer. It is the only Rarden Township statewide.

Government
The township is governed by a three-member board of trustees, who are elected in November of odd-numbered years to a four-year term beginning on the following January 1. Two are elected in the year after the presidential election and one is elected in the year before it. There is also an elected township fiscal officer, who serves a four-year term beginning on April 1 of the year after the election, which is held in November of the year before the presidential election. Vacancies in the fiscal officership or on the board of trustees are filled by the remaining trustees.

References

External links
County website

Townships in Scioto County, Ohio
Townships in Ohio